Ochrus is a genus of beetles in the family Cerambycidae, containing the following species:

 Ochrus chapadense Napp & Martins, 1982
 Ochrus duplicatus Napp & Martins, 1982
 Ochrus grammoderus Lacordaire, 1869
 Ochrus ornatus (Fisher, 1935)
 Ochrus tippmanni (Lane, 1956)
 Ochrus trifasciatus Dalens & Touroult, 2011

References

Hesperophanini